Château de Laurens Castelet is a château in Benquet, Landes, Nouvelle-Aquitaine, France. It dates to 1872.

Châteaux in Landes (department)
Houses completed in 1872